Peace of Pressburg or Treaty of Pressburg may refer to:
 Peace of Pressburg (1271), a treaty settling territorial claims between Bohemia and Hungary
 Peace of Pressburg (1491), between Hungary and the Holy Roman Empire over Lower Austria and the Hungarian succession
 Peace of Pressburg (1626), between Gabriel Bethlen of Transylvania, the leader of an uprising against the Habsburg Monarchy, and Ferdinand II, Holy Roman Emperor
 Peace of Pressburg (1805), between France and Austria ending the War of the Third Coalition and marking the effective end of the Holy Roman Empire

See also 
 List of treaties

cs:Prešpurský mír
pt:Paz de Pressburg
tr:Pressburg Barışı